Suzanne F. Nossel is a human rights advocate, former government official, author, and Chief Executive Officer of PEN America. She has served in a variety of leadership roles in the corporate, non-profit, and government sectors and has led PEN America since 2013. She is the author of Dare to Speak: Defending Free Speech for All.

Non-profit career

Nossel currently serves as Chief Executive Officer of the literary and human rights organization PEN America. She oversaw the unification of PEN America with Los Angeles-based PEN Center USA, the establishment of a Washington, D.C. office to drive policy advocacy in the nation's capital, and the creation of a network of PEN America chapters across the organization. Under her leadership, the organization has advocated for free expression in Hong Kong and China, Myanmar, Eurasia, and the United States. PEN America has also developed programs focused on campus free speech, online harassment, artistic freedom, writing for justice and a range of other issues. PEN America has also expanded its literary programming, reimagining the PEN America Literary Awards, expanding the PEN World Voices Festival outside New York City, and through writing programs dedicated to amplifying lesser heard voices, including incarcerated writers and DREAMers.

Nossel previously served as Executive Director of Amnesty International USA and as chief operating officer at Human Rights Watch. She has served as a Board Member of Tides since 2013.

Government career

Nossel served as the Deputy Assistant Secretary of State for the Bureau of International Organization Affairs in 2009, where she was responsible for multilateral human rights, humanitarian affairs, women's issues, public diplomacy, press, and congressional relations. At the State Department, Nossel played a leading role in U.S. engagement at the U.N. Human Rights Council, including the initiation of groundbreaking human rights resolutions on Iran, Syria, Libya, Côte d'Ivoire, freedom of association, freedom of expression, and the first U.N. resolution on the rights of lesbian, gay, bisexual and transgender persons.

From 1999 to 2001, she served as Deputy to the Ambassador for U.N. Management and Reform at the U.S. Mission to the United Nations under Richard C. Holbrooke. She was the lead U.S. negotiator in settling U.S. arrears to the United Nations through a landmark consensus agreement reached by the UN's General Assembly.

She served as a law clerk on the U.S. Court of Appeals for the District of Columbia Circuit for Judge Judith W. Rogers.

Private sector career

Early in her career, Nossel was an associate in consumer and media practice at the consulting firm McKinsey and Company. She later worked Vice President of U.S. Business Development for Bertelsmann Media and Vice president of strategy and operations for the Wall Street Journal.

Awards

In 1997 Suzanne Nossel was awarded a Kauffman Fellowship for showing exceptional promise for a career in public interest law. Shortly thereafter she began to work as a Skadden Fellow at Children's Rights, a public interest advocacy organization in New York City.

Publications

Nossel is the author of Dare to Speak: Defending Free Speech for All, a set of principles to chart a course for free speech that also promotes equity and inclusion. Excerpts from the book have appeared in LitHub, the Washington Post, and the LA Times. She is a featured columnist for Foreign Policy magazine and has published op-eds in The New York Times, Politico, and The Guardian, among others.

Nossel co-wrote, along with PEN America President Andrew Solomon, an op-ed piece for The New York Times on PEN's decision to present the PEN/Toni and James C. Goodale Free Expression Courage Award to Charlie Hebdo.

In Foreign Affairs, she has covered topics ranging from the changing nature of liberal internationalism to Samantha Power's ambassadorship in the United Nations. In 2004, she coined the term "Smart Power", which was the title of an article she published in Foreign Affairs that year. It later became the theme of Secretary of State Hillary Clinton's confirmation testimony and guided her tenure in office.

Education
Nossel graduated magna cum laude from both Harvard College and Harvard Law School.

Personal life

Nossel was born in Westchester, New York, the daughter of South African parents and granddaughter of refugees from Nazi Germany who fled to South Africa during the 1930s. She traces her interest in human rights to her growing up Jewish in America, and her visits to apartheid South Africa in her youth.  She has frequently visited relatives in Israel, saying "It's a place where I feel very comfortable and at home."

She lives with her husband and two children in Manhattan.

References

External links

 Video: .
 Video: .
 Video: .

1969 births
Activists from New York (state)
American human rights activists
Women human rights activists
American people of South African descent
Amnesty International people
Living people
People from Manhattan
People from Westchester County, New York
Scarsdale High School alumni
Harvard College alumni
Harvard Law School alumni
American women non-fiction writers
21st-century American non-fiction writers
21st-century American women writers
Facebook Oversight Board members